Type C1 was a designation for cargo ships built for the United States Maritime Commission before and during World War II. Total production was 493 ships built from 1940 to 1945. The first C1 types were the smallest of the three original Maritime Commission designs, meant for shorter routes where high speed and capacity were less important.  Only a handful were delivered prior to Pearl Harbor. But many C1-A and C1-B ships were already in the works and were delivered during 1942. Many were converted to military purposes including troop transports during the war.

The Type C1-M ship was a separate design, for a significantly smaller and shallower draft vessel. This design evolved as an answer for the projected needs for military transport and supply of the Pacific Ocean theater of World War II.

Type C1 ships under the control of the British Ministry of War Transport took an Empire name even if built with another name e.g. Cape Turner.

Origins
The United States Maritime Commission (MARCOM) was an agency of the United States government that was created by the Merchant Marine Act of 1936, passed by Congress on 29 June 1936 and replaced the U.S. Shipping Board which had existed since World War I. It was intended to formulate a merchant shipbuilding program to design and build five hundred modern merchant cargo ships to supplement and replace the World War I vintage vessels, including Hog Islander ships, that comprised the bulk of the U.S. Merchant Marine. These old standardized ship designs ranged in size from 5,075dwt to 7,500dwt, 8,800dwt and 9,600dwt for the most common mass-produced types. They either had steam turbines or triple expansion engines, burning oil their boilers. None of the World War I standard designs had diesel engines.

From 1939 through the end of World War II, MARCOM funded and administered the largest and most successful merchant shipbuilding effort in world history, producing thousands of ships, including Liberty ships, Victory ships, and others, notably type C1 ships, type C2 ships, type C3 ships, type C4 ships, T2 tankers, Landing Ship Tank (LST)s and patrol frigates. By the end of the war, U.S. shipyards working under MARCOM contracts had built a total of 5,777 oceangoing merchant and naval ships.

The C series of ships differed from the Liberty and Victory ships.  The first C series vessels were designed prior to hostilities and were meant to be commercially viable ships to modernize the US Merchant Marine, and reduce the US reliance on foreign shipping.  The Liberty ships were a throwback to late 19th century British designs with reciprocating steam engines, but were very cheap to build in large quantities; Victory ships evolved from the Liberty ships but used modern turbine engines.  The C series ships were more expensive to produce, but their economic viability lasted well into the late 1960s and early 1970s in military and merchant fleets.  Several ships are still in operation.

Variations
The primary difference between them was that C1-A ships were shelter deck ships, while C1-B ships were full scantling ships. The C1-M was the type with the largest production; it was a significant variation from the original C1 design in size, performance and profile; these were shorter, narrower, slower and the superstructure was farther toward the stern.

The C-1 (A and B variants) employed two kind of propulsion systems. One group comprising 19 C1-A, 85 C1-B and all 13 C1-S-AY1 used 4,000hp compound turbines (one high pressure and one low pressure turbine) and turbo-electric generators for auxiliary power. The other group of 46 C1-A and 10 C1-B used two 2,000hp diesel engines connected to a single reduction gearset via magnetic couplings, in the same family as the system used on various C3 ships where four such engines were coupled to one gearset for a total of 8,000hp. The C1-M variant used diesel propulsion exclusively, but only a single 2,000hp range engine and without magnetic couplings. All turbines and diesel engines were sourced from a variety of manufacturers.

C1-A

Forty-six Type C1-A ships were built at Pennsylvania Shipyards, Inc. in Beaumont, Texas, with another 19 being built by Pusey and Jones in Wilmington, Delaware (not to be confused with Consolidated Steel's Wilmington, California location).  The majority were built with diesel motors, though 19 were built with steam turbine engines. These were shelter deck ships, having a very light upper deck, the sides of which are open ports to the second or main deck.

The first keels were laid in 1939. Two of the Pusey and Jones ships were converted to PT boat tenders before entering service, including .
        
Some of the diesel vessels were powered by 2, 6-cylinder Nordberg 2-stroke engines (Sulzer type) driving the single shaft via magnetic couplings and a reduction gear-box. They were manufactured by Nordberg Manufacturing Company. The engine speed was 220 rpm and the shaft 110 rpm. This configuration made maneuvering very easy when entering port, as one engine was run in reverse and the other ahead; change of direction was simply performed by energizing the appropriate magnetic coupling. All auxiliary equipment was electric. The engine room was a pleasure to operate and the workmanship outstanding.

 Pennsylvania Shipyards, Inc., TX: 46 (launched May 1941 — Dec 1944)
 Pusey and Jones, DE: 19 (Jan 1942 — May 1945)

Converted to Troop Ships

  (MC-301) at Bethlehem Brooklyn 56th Street
  (MC-300) at Cardinal Engineering Company
  (MC-141) at Eureka Shipbuilding Company
  (MC-296) at McNulty Shipyards
  (MC-303) at Arthur Tickle

4 Modified and redesignated (to United States Navy)

 Cargo
  (MC-138) as  then  then 
  (MC-225) as 
 Motor Torpedo Boat Tender
  (MC-304) as 
  (MC-891) as

C1-B

The Type C1-B ships were built in eight different yards, all but 15 in West Coast yards, all but 20 in California, the majority at Consolidated Steel Corporation in Wilmington, California. All but ten of the C1-B ships had steam turbine engines; the diesels were all built at Seattle-Tacoma SB Corp., Tacoma, Washington and Western Pipe & Steel, San Francisco, California, with each producing five ships. The C1-B were full scantling ships with three decks in which the frames hold the same dimensions as the upper deck. Full scantling ships have deck gear sufficient to completely unload their cargoes.

In 1939, under the Long Range Shipbuilding Program, contracts for 38 ships in batches of 2 to 5 vessels were awarded after one round of competitive bidding. Bethlehem San Francisco and Bethlehem Staten Island only produced on this occasion for the Maritime Commission. For Seattle-Tacoma, the C1-B contract prompted the reopening (and rebuilding) of the Tacoma yard. Consolidated Steel entered the shipbuilding business in 1939. Timing makes these ship constructions interesting, as they were on slipways when the U.S. shipbuilding industry was going through the transition of 1940/1941 towards war time production and many ships, whether afloat or building, were reassigned to fulfill new duties. Unsuccessful bids were made by the General Engineering & Dry Dock Company, the Tampa Shipbuilding and Engineering Company, the Newburgh Shipbuilding and Repair Company of New York, the Sun Shipbuilding and Dry Dock Company, the Los Angeles Shipbuilding and Dry Dock Company. Bids (for either C1-A or C1-B in either steam of diesel variants) were opened on 11 July 1939. Pusey and Jones successfully bid on 2 C1-A ships. Contracts were awarded in September 1939. Two of these early-built ships joined the ship launching parade of the Liberty Fleet Day on 27 September 1941. 

 Federal Shipbuilding, Kearny, NJ: 5
  (MC-67) ...  (MC-71)
 Consolidated Steel, Long Beach, CA: 4
  (MC-75) ...  (MC-78)
 Bethlehem Sparrows Point, MD: 5
  (MC-79) ...  (MC-83)
 Bethlehem San Francisco, CA: 5 (details) 
 Bethlehem Staten Island, NY: 5
  (MC-89) ...  (MC-93)
 Western Pipe & Steel, San Francisco, CA: 5 (diesel)
  (MC-94) ...  (MC-98)
 Seattle-Tacoma Shipbuilding, WA: 5 diesel (details)

after the Emergency Shipbuilding Program picked up momentum, Consolidated Steel remained the only manufacturer of the C1-B type.

 Consolidated Steel, Long Beach, CA: 14 (in addition to the original 4)
 Consolidated Steel, Wilmington, CA: 47

Converted to Troop Ships (all steam turbine driven)

  (MC-83) at Bethlehem Brooklyn 27th Street, New York
  (MC-76) at Bethlehem Brooklyn 27th Street, New York
  (MC-84) at Bethlehem Hoboken, New York
  (MC-91) at Bethlehem Hoboken, New York
  (MC-265) at Todd Hoboken, New York
  (MC-71) at Zalud Marine Corporation
  (MC-78) at Zalud Marine Corporation
  (MC-87) at Arthur Blair
  (MC-92) at Arthur Blair
  (MC-503) at General Engineering & Drydock Company, Alameda
  (MC-505) at Matson Navigation, San Francisco
  (MC-502) at Moore Dry Dock Company, Oakland
  (MC-510) at United Engineering Co., Alameda
  (MC-504) at Todd Seattle
  (MC-509) in San Francisco
  (MC-1025) at Matson Navigation, San Francisco
  (MC-263) completed as troopship by the Consolidated Steel Corporation
  (MC-264) 

7 Modified and redesignated (to United States Navy) (all steam turbine driven)

 SS Fred Morris (MC-70) as submarine tender  and then as internal combustion engone repair ship 
 Navy troop transports
 Cargo ships
 SS Alcoa Partner (MC-493) to US Navy as 
 Hospital ships
 these ships were originally ordered as uncompleted hospital ships from Consolidated Steel and completed at nearby facilities in the Port of Los Angeles

C1-S-AY1
The C1-S-AY1 subtype of thirteen ships built by Consolidated Steel Corporation was modified from the C1-B design for use as troopships by Great Britain under lend-lease called Landing Ship Infantry, Large and they were originally ordered as troopships. These ships were all given two-word names beginning with "Empire", such as SS Empire Spearhead.  was lost at the Normandy Invasion, to a mine.   was sunk by a torpedo from a German U-boat on 28 December 1944. The original Cape names are what the ships were launched as and by which name they were known to the Maritime Commission.

 Cape Berkeley /  / 
 Cape Compass /  / 
 Cape Gregory / HMS Empire Halberd / 
 Cape Marshall' / 
 Cape Pine / HMS Empire Lance / 
 Cape St. Roque / HMS Empire Mace / 
 Cape Turner / HMS Empire Rapier
 Cape Argos /  / 
 Cape Lobos / 
 Cape Girardeau /  / 
 Cape St. Vincent / HMS Empire Arquebus / 
 Cape Comorin / HMS Empire Gauntlet / 
 Cape Washington /  / 

C1-M

The diesel (M for Motor) powered C1-M Type ships were a separate design from the C1-A and C1-B, meant for shorter runs and shallow harbors, either along the coasts, or for "island hopping" in the Pacific.  These ships were shorter, narrower, and had less draft than the earlier C1 designs, and were rated at only .  is an example of a C1-M ship.

The C1-M-AV1 subtype, a general cargo ship with one large diesel engine, was the most numerous. About 215 of this type were built in ten different shipyards. Consolidated Steel Corp., Ltd. of Wilmington, California built the largest number – about a quarter of all built. About 65 of this subtype were complete for the U.S. Navy, like the USS Gadsden built by Walter Butler Shipyard. Those ships were generally named after counties in the U.S. C1-M-AV1 ships are a Alamosa-class cargo ships.

One C1-ME-AV6 (also called C1-M-AV7) subype was built, . Instead of the diesel engine direct drive of the AV1 subtypes, it used diesel-electric drive.  The diesel engine powered a generator to produce electricity, and an electric motor with  actually powered the vessel.

Four of the C1-MT-BU1 subtype were built as lumber carriers, with twin screws. Built by Albina Engine & Machine Works, Portland, Oregon.

The final subtype, C1-M-AV8, had a variable-pitch propeller. Only one ship was planned as this type, but five previously launched C1-M-AV1 ships were converted to this type for France.

 Launched August 1944 — December 1945
 Consolidated Steel Corporation, CA: 55
 Kaiser Richmond Shipyards, CA: 24
 Pennsylvania Shipyards, Inc., TX: 25 (1 AV8)
 Walter Butler Shipbuilders Inc., WI: 22
 Walter Butler Shipbuilders Inc., MN: 18
 Southeastern Shipbuilding Corporation, GA: 18 (5 AV8)
 Leathem D. Smith Shipbuilding Company, WI: 17 (1 AV6)
 Froemming Brothers, WI: 14
 J.A. Jones Construction, GA: 14
 Globe Shipbuilding Company, WI: 11
 Albina Engine & Machine Works, OR: 4 (4 C1-MT-BU1)

Modified and redesignated

 Cargo - AK (63)
 63 s
 (these ships probably were no different than defensively equipped C1-M-AV1 merchant vessels)
 MC-2101 ... MC-2112 to  ... 
 MC-2141 ... MC-2148 to  ... 
 MC-2374 ... MC-2377 to  ... 
 MC-2113 ... MC-2127 to  ... 
 MC-2151 ... MC-2169 to  ... 
 MC-2477 to 
 MC-2323 to 
 MC-2486 to 
 MC-2172 to 
 MC-2464 to 
 MC-2329 to 
 Aviation stores issue ships - AVS (3AK)
 3 
 AK-185 -> 
 AK-199 -> 
 AK-206 -> 
 Stores ships - AF (1)
 
 Miscellaneous Auxiliary ships - AG (1 + 2APC)
 T-APC-119 -> 
 T-APC-118 -> 
  
 Missile Range Instrumentation Ship - AGM (4 + 1AK + 1???)
 
 
 AK-212 -> 
 
  (alamosa?)
 
 Survey ship - AGS (1APC)
 T-APC-117 -> 
 Coastal Transport- APC (4)
 
  -> T-AGS-35
  -> T-AG-171
  -> T-AG-169

Final disposition
Many of these ships have been sold and scrapped but numerous examples are still in service with Non Governmental Organizations (NGO)s such as "Friend Ships". That organization used the ex "" built in Superior Wisconsin and renamed the "Spirit of Grace" until she was removed in 2006 and scrapped in 2008.  Several are sailing in merchant service around the world making port calls and delivering cargo.

 Type C1 specifications 

 Quantities of Type C1 ships 

Note any ship in the control of the British Ministry of War Transport took an Empire name even if being built as another name e.g. Cape TurnerNotable incidents

 Liscomb Lykes a C1-B, was wrecked and lost in New Caledonia in 1943.
 Diamond Knot a C1-M-AV1, collided with the Fenn Victory in the Strait of Juan de Fuca and sunk in 1947. 
 Idaho a C1-B, was wrecked and scrapped in  1962.
 Cape Constance a	C1-B, was hit by kamikaze plane in the Philippines on 4 November 1944 and was repaired. Later she was wrecked and abandoned in 1947.
 Cape Kumukaki a C1-B, renamed Flying Enterprise was wrecked in the English Channel in a storm and sank on 10 January 1952.
 Cape Frio a C1-A, was wrecked and scrapped in 1964.
 Cape Avinoff a C1-A, renamed Tropicana was wrecked and scrapped in 1966.
 Gwinnett a	C1-M-AV1, (USN AK 185) was wrecked and scrapped in 1968.
  a C1-M-AV1, was wrecked and abandoned in 1970.
 Rockdale a C1-M-AV1, (USN AK 208) was wrecked and scrapped in 1969.
 Traverse a C1-M-AV1, was wrecked and scrapped in 1962.
 Elmer J. Burr a C1-M-AV1, renamed Crown Reefer was wrecked and scrapped in 1946.
 Kenneth E. Gruennert a C1-M-AV1, renamed  was wrecked in grounding near Livorno on 15 December 1952 and then scrapped.
 Star Knot a C1-M-AV1, was wrecked and scrapped in 1967.
 Crown Knot a C1-M-AV1, was wrecked and sank in 1974.
 Carrick Bend a C1-M-AV1, was wrecked and scrapped in 1969.
 Mariner's Splice a	C1-M-AV1, was wrecked and abandoned in 1971.
 Fisherman's Bend  a C1-M-AV1, was  wrecked and abandoned in 1965.
 Bight Knot a C1-M-AV1, was  wrecked and scrapped in 1970.
 Oregon Fir a C1-MT-BU1 wrecked and scrapped in 1967.
 Hickory Glen a C1-M-AV1, was wrecked and abandoned in 1970.
 Hickory Beck a C1-M-AV1, was renamed Coastal Cadet, was wrecked and scrapped in 1969.
 Coastal Courser  a C1-M-AV1, was wrecked and scrapped in 1970.
 Sheepshank a C1-M-AV1, was wrecked and sank in 1961.
 Rolling Hitch a C1-M-AV1, renamed MS Hoegh Aronde sank in 1963. She started leaking off the coast of Morocco at 31.30N 10.45W, steaming from Sassandra to Valencia with a cargo of 3,000 tons of phosphates and 2,000 tons of logs. She sent out a SOS with a message "sinking fast", but of the Norwegian crew of 32, 14 survivors were found in the sea.
 Yard Hitch, a C1-M-AV1, built by Froemming Bros. Inc., Milwaukee, Wisconsin which sank in 1967.
 Boatswain's Hitch a C1-M-AV1, sank in 1971.
 Masthead Knot a C1-M-AV1, caught fire and sank in 1969.
 Long Eye a C1-M-AV1, renamed Almagro, sank 1976.Reeving Eye a C1-M-AV1, sank in 1971.Hickory Tor C1-M-AV1, renamed Coastal Skipper, sank 1971.

Type C1 ships
 MV Cape Texas'', Type C1-A 
 SS Cape Kumukaki/Flying Enterprise

See also 
 Type C2 ship
 Type C3 ship
 Type C4 ship
 T2 tanker
 Liberty ship
 Victory ship
 Hog Islander
 U.S. Merchant Marine Academy

References 

 
 
 
 
  including definitions of terms
 
 

C1
 
Standard ship types of the United States